The Saab Formula Junior was a car built in 1960 by the Swedish car maker Saab.

In 1960, the Saab 93F was being replaced by the Saab 96 and a new 841 cc engine was developed. The competition and testing departments of Saab did not want to see any series produced sports engines with the new size until they had a chance to try some new ideas. These ideas led to the creation of these Formula Junior race cars with which Saab surprised the motor racing world in the late autumn of 1960. The cars first showed up at the Gelleråsen racetrack at Karlskoga and then at the Eläintarhanajot race in Helsinki (Finland), in 1961, finishing 4th and 5th.

The body design was unusual. Instead of using a multi-tubular spaceframe chassis like other Formula Junior cars, Saab chose to construct an advanced aluminium monocoque car, with a plastic nose-cone.

The fibreglass nose protected a 'bored-out' horizontal 950 cc three cylinder two stroke engine, with two dual Solex carburettors developing some 95 bhp - (one of the carburettors was cut in half, thus providing three chokes — one for each of the three cylinders). There was a cross-flow radiator, for cooling. The suspension was purpose-built, incorporating a unique type of tensile spring. The cars did not do very well in races, due to their cornering ability and their relatively low-powered engine (the later regulations allowed up to 1100 cc engines). Nonetheless, two first places and a track record (Stockholm) were achieved. The 70%-30% front-rear weight distribution created pronounced understeer. This was only partially overcome by designing the rear suspension to encourage the inside rear wheel to lift during cornering. Only two cars were built, as later regulations made them even less competitive. They were retired at the end of the 1961 racing season. History records them as having fulfilled an important developmental role for Saab's competition department.

The cars appeared in typical Swedish livery of blue and yellow. The drivers were Gösta Karlsson, Carl-Magnus Skogh and Erik Carlsson.

Sources
 The Saab Way by Gunnar A. Sjögren.

Formula Junior
Front-wheel-drive vehicles
Formula Junior cars